OFM may refer to:

 Office of Foreign Missions, part of the US Department of State
 Officine Ferroviarie Meridionali, an Italian railway and rolling stock manufacturer
 OFM (South Africa), a radio station in Bloemfontein, South Africa
Open flow microperfusion, a sampling method for clinical and preclinical drug development studies and biomarker research
 Office of the Fire Marshal of Ontario, a fire investigation agency in Ontario, Canada
 Oracle Fusion Middleware, a company
 Orange Factory Music, a music production team
 Order of Friars Minor, a Franciscan religious order
 Order of Friars Minor Capuchin, a Franciscan religious order
 Conventual Franciscans, a Franciscan religious order
 Orthodox file manager

pt:OFM